Katiuscia Canoro (born 4 December 1978) is a Brazilian actress.

Biography

Filmography

Television
 2012 - A Grande Família - Kelly Aparecida
 2008-2012 - Zorra Total - Lady Kate / Kate Lúcia
 2010 - Papai Noel Existe - Suelen

Cinema
 2004 - Vovó Vai Ao Supermercado - direction: Waldemir Milani
 2005 - Sem Ana - direction: Rafael Barion
 2005 - A Guisa de Orquídeas - direction: Arthur Tuoto
 2005 - Do Papel Pra Tela - direction: Richard Frankl

Theater
 Marie - 1992 Direção: Labouret
 O poder da Amizade – 1993 direction: Daniel Arthur
 Amor de Ciclovia – 1992 direction: Lucia Du Arte
 Os Ovos De Pascoa Sumiram – 1994 direction: Lucia Du Arte
 A Bruxinha Que Era Boa – 1995 direction: Carla Almeida
 Festa do Uirapuru – 1995 direction: Daniel Arthur
 A Floresta Sumiu – 1996 direction: Daniel Arthur
 Anjos e Pecados – 1998 direction: Treat
 O Auto Da Compadecida – 1999 direction: Demian Garcia
 Estrada do pecado – 2004 direction: Cesar Almeida
 Medea Material – TCP 2004 direction: Mariana Percovich
 Gatos Musical Rock - 2005 direction: Ronald Lima
 Mulheres de Chico – 2005 direction: Mauricio Vogue
 Panico No Mercado – 2005 direction: Franklin Albuquerque
 Contadores de Historias – 2005 direction: Mauricio Vogue
 O Pentáculo – 2006 direction: Franklin Albuquerque
 CintaLiga - 2006 direction: CIA Das Meninas
 Humor Com Sabor Picante - 2006 direction: Mauricio Vogue
 Memória – TCP teatro Guairá- 2006 direction: Moacir Chaves
 Risorama -2006-FTC
 D.Graça – 2007 teatro Maria Clara Machado RJ direction: cia colapsico
 Macbeth - 2007 direction: Moacir Chaves
 PoutPouRir – 2008 direction: Leandro Goulart e Afra Gomes

References

External links 
 

1978 births
Living people
Actresses from Curitiba
Brazilian people of Italian descent
Brazilian stage actresses
Brazilian television actresses
20th-century Brazilian actresses
21st-century Brazilian actresses